Joe Binion (born March 26, 1961) is a retired American professional basketball player.

College career
Born in Rochester, New York, Binion played college basketball with the North Carolina Agricultural and Technical State University.

Professional career
Binion was selected by the San Antonio Spurs, in the 3rd round (57th pick overall) of the 1984 NBA Draft. Binion played for the Portland Trail Blazers (1986–87) in the NBA, in 11 games. After that, he played overseas.

See also
 List of NCAA Division I men's basketball players with 2000 points and 1000 rebounds

External links
Lega Basket Serie A profile Retrieved 15 June 2015 
NBA profile  Retrieved 15 June 2015 
REALGM.com profile

References

1961 births
Living people
American expatriate basketball people in Israel
American expatriate basketball people in Italy
American men's basketball players
Basketball players from New York (state)
Florida Stingers players
Kansas City Sizzlers players
Lega Basket Serie A players
Libertas Liburnia Basket Livorno players
Maccabi Haifa B.C. players
North Carolina A&T Aggies men's basketball players
Olimpia Basket Pistoia players
Pallacanestro Reggiana players
Portland Trail Blazers players
Power forwards (basketball)
San Antonio Spurs draft picks
Sarasota Stingers players
Sportspeople from Rochester, New York
Topeka Sizzlers players
Virtus Bologna players
American expatriate basketball people in the Philippines
Great Taste Coffee Makers players
Philippine Basketball Association imports